The  is one of the two baseball halls of fame in Japan, the other being the . The Meikyukai is a limited company for public benefit.

Founded by Hall of Fame pitcher Masaichi Kaneda in 1978, the Meikyukai honors players born after 1926 (the beginning of Shōwa period). Players are automatically inducted if they reach career totals of 2,000 hits, 200 wins in the Japanese professional leagues. Since 2003, players having 250 saves are also inducted, as well as recognizing records in Major League Baseball (MLB). Since 2019, players who did not reach any of the above three figures, but deemed to have equivalent career achievements can be inducted upon nomination by committee and received 75% more votes from current members.

Inductees are awarded a special jacket, and participate in various baseball-related events during the off-season. Meikyukai members mostly make appearances in charity and volunteer events. The organization holds annual meetings and a golf tournament, which is often broadcast on television. All of the money raised from the golf tournament is donated to the Red Cross.

History 
Masaichi Kaneda founded Meikyukai on July 24, 1978. In addition to Kaneda, the founding members of the club were Kazuhisa Inao, Masaaki Koyama, Keishi Suzuki, Tetsuya Yoneda, Shinichi Etoh, Sadaharu Oh, Morimichi Takagi, Masahiro Doi, Shigeo Nagashima, Katsuya Nomura, Isao Harimoto, Yoshinori Hirose, Kazuhiro Yamauchi, Takao Kajimoto, Mutsuo Minagawa and Minoru Murayama.

In 2008, founder Masaichi Kaneda passed on club leadership to home run champion Sadaharu Oh after running it for more than 30 years. Kaneda later quit the club when it reformed as limited company in 2010.

As of December 2022, Atsuya Furuta is the current chairperson of the club.

The most recent inductees are Koji Uehara and Kyuji Fujikawa in 2022. Despite neither of them reached 200 wins nor 250 saves in their career, Meikyukai offered them membership as Meikyukai deemed both players' overall career achievement are well enough to be introduced.

Qualifications for inclusion 
The founding members of the club limited membership to players born after 1926, partly because they only wanted members that had begun their career after the two-league system of Japanese baseball was established in 1950 (when the Japanese Baseball League reorganized into Nippon Professional Baseball), but mostly because Kaneda did not want to include qualified members, such as Tetsuharu Kawakami, that were older than he was. Originally, only players born in Shōwa period(1926-1988) can join, the rule was changed in 2012, allowing post-Shōwa born players to be inducted in the near future.

Records in Major League Baseball (MLB) are also valid in counting the numbers; However, Meikyukai only takes records from the point where the player started his NPB career (i.e.: records before debut in NPB don't count). For example, Alex Ramírez's 86 hits in MLB before his NPB career were excluded and he was not inducted until he recorded his 2,000th NPB hit on April 6, 2013.

Though other records such as home runs, stolen bases, and strikeouts are not officially included in the qualifications, they are taken into consideration if a player is few short of required hit/win/save(s). Yutaka Fukumoto was specially inducted when he reached 800 career stolen bases (he would later mark 2,000 career hits). Such inductions was formally codified in 2019, allowing players who are originally not eligible to be inducted. As committee considered 200 wins are too difficult to be achieved for modern era pitchers, and players having notable combined pitching(batting) records should get qualified as well.

Nationality is not officially regarded as a qualification, as two of the founding members (Sadaharu Oh and Isao Harimoto) did not have a Japanese Nationality when Meikyukai was founded. However, only two non-Japanese player (Alex Ramírez and Alfonso Soriano) so far has met the milestone since foundation, and only Ramírez was recognized as a qualified member.

Members

Current Members
Active NPB/MLB players (as of end of 2022 season) are indicated with an asterisk (*).

 Koji Akiyama
 Shinnosuke Abe
 Norichika Aoki*
 Hiromasa Arai
 Takahiro Arai
 Masahiro Araki
 Michiyo Arito
 Masahiro Doi 
 Yutaka Enatsu
 Taira Fujita
 Yutaka Fukumoto
 Kosuke Fukudome
 Kazuya Fukuura
 Kyuji Fujikawa
 Atsuya Furuta
 Isao Harimoto
 Osamu Higashio
 Masaji Hiramatsu
 Yoshinori Hirose
 Tadahito Iguchi
 Atsunori Inaba
 Takuro Ishii
 Hitoki Iwase
 Tomoaki Kanemoto
 Hideji Katō
 Manabu Kitabeppu
 Kazuhiro Kiyohara
 Hiroki Kokubo
 Norihiro Komada
 Masaaki Koyama
 Kimiyasu Kudo
 Takumi Kuriyama*
 Hiroki Kuroda
 Tomonori Maeda
 Makoto Matsubara
 Hideki Matsui
 Kazuo Matsui
 Shinya Miyamoto
 Norihiro Nakamura
 Shigeo Nagashima
 Hideo Nomo
 Kenjiro Nomura
 Michihiro Ogasawara
 Sadaharu Oh
 Alex Ramírez
 Hayato Sakamoto*
 Kazuhiro Sasaki
 Isao Shibata
 Ichiro
 Keishi Suzuki
 Shingo Takatsu
 Yukio Tanaka
 Motonobu Tanishige
 Kazuyoshi Tatsunami
 Takashi Toritani
 Seiichi Uchikawa
 Koji Uehara
 Kazuhiro Wada
 Tsutomu Wakamatsu
 Hisashi Yamada
 Koji Yamamoto
 Masahiro Yamamoto
 Hiroyuki Yamazaki
 Tetsuya Yoneda

Honored Members
Deceased players who died during their membership are considered as "Honored Members".

 Shinichi Etoh
 Kazuhisa Inao 
 Hiromitsu Kadota
 Takao Kajimoto
 Sachio Kinugasa
 Mutsuo Minagawa
 Choji Murata
 Minoru Murayama
 Katsuya Nomura 
 Yasunori Oshima
 Katsuo Osugi
 Morimichi Takagi
 Kazuhiro Yamauchi

Former Members and Non-Inductees
Masaichi Kaneda, Kenichi Yazawa, Tsuneo Horiuchi were once members of Meikyukai, but later quitted due to their own reasons.

Hiromitsu Ochiai reached 2,000 hits in 1995, but declined membership because Kaneda and other members had repeatedly criticized him during his career.

First baseman Kihachi Enomoto (with 2,314 career hits) didn't decline membership, but never participated in any of the club's meetings or events before his death in 2012, and was not recognized as a formal member nor a honored member.

Left fielder and second baseman Alfonso Soriano (with 2,097 career hits) technically met the 2,000 hits requirement in 2013, but he was not recognized as a formal member. Many suggest his significantly low NPB career hit (only 2 out of 2,097) preventing him from being introduced.

See also
Baseball awards#Japan

References

External links
 
 

History of baseball in Japan
Japanese I
Awards established in 1978
1978 establishments in Japan